The 2022–23 season is the 21st season in the existence of AFC Wimbledon and the club's first season back in League Two since the 2015–16 season following their relegation from League One last season. In addition to the league, they will also compete in the 2022–23 FA Cup, the 2022–23 EFL Cup and the 2022–23 EFL Trophy.

Transfers

In

Out

Loans in

Loans out

Pre-season and friendlies
On 31 May, AFC Wimbledon announced their first four pre-season friendlies. A fifth friendly match was added, against Farnborough.

Competitions

Overall record

League Two

League table

Results summary

Results by round

Matches

On 23 June, the league fixtures were announced.

FA Cup

AFC Wimbledon were drawn away to Weymouth in the first round.

EFL Cup

Wimbledon were drawn at home to Gillingham in the first round.

EFL Trophy

On 20 June, the initial Group stage draw was made, grouping AFC Wimbleon with Crawley Town and Portsmouth. Three days later, Aston Villa U21s joined Southern Group B. In the third round, the Dons were drawn away to Plymouth Argyle.

References

2022-23
AFC Wimbledon
AFC Wimbledon